Alexander Stuart FRS FRCP (1673–1742) was a British natural philosopher and physician.

He was born in Aberdeen, Scotland.

He graduated from Marischal College, University of Aberdeen, in 1691 with an MA and became a ship's surgeon, serving on the London from 1701 to 1704 and on the Europe from 1704 to 1707. While at sea he kept records of his operations and sent specimens of new creatures to Hans Sloane, with several reports on such animals being published in the Philosophical Transactions of the Royal Society.

After returning to land in 1708 he started a medical degree at Leiden University, and he graduated on 22 June 1711. He served as a doctor for the British Army for a bit but returned to England. He was elected a Fellow of the Royal Society in 1714, and in 1719 he became the first doctor to practise at Westminster Hospital, transferring to St George's Hospital in 1733. In 1728 he became a physician-in-ordinary for Caroline of Ansbach and was elected a Fellow of the Royal College of Physicians the same year. He retired in 1736.

In 1738 he gave the first Croonian Lecture of the Royal Society, and in 1740 he was awarded the Copley Medal by the same institution. He delivered the Croonian Lecture again in 1740.

Despite the money he was earning as physician-in-ordinary he was heavily in debt when he died on 15 September 1742.

References

1673 births
1742 deaths
Scientists from Aberdeen
Fellows of the Royal Society
Fellows of the Royal College of Physicians
Recipients of the Copley Medal
18th-century Scottish medical doctors
17th-century Scottish people
18th-century Scottish people
Alumni of the University of Aberdeen
Physicians-in-Ordinary
Freemasons of the Premier Grand Lodge of England
18th-century Scottish scientists
17th-century Scottish scientists
17th-century Scottish medical doctors